The Institute For Education, known as IFE, is a U.S. 501(c)(3) nonprofit organization headquartered in Washington, DC. The organization facilitates bipartisan collaboration by convening and networking high level leaders from the bounds of politics, business, media, academia, and more. A selection of guests hosted by the Institute include Hillary Rodham Clinton, John McCain, Antonin Scalia, Orrin Hatch, Ruth Bader Ginsburg and Arianna Huffington.

The Institute regularly holds exclusive events hosted at embassies and private residences. The most high profile of these events are the INFO Roundtables, which have been hosted by prominent leaders including Supreme Court justices, governors, Cabinet secretaries, CIA and FBI directors, Nobel laureates, and professional athletes.

History
Founder and CEO Kathy Kemper created the Institute for Education in 1991 when her husband, James Valentine, suggested she organize a breakfast to introduce her political contacts with his business colleagues. IFE established a reputation for diplomacy by facilitating the first-ever regional summit between the Governors of Maryland, Virginia, and, the Mayor of DC (Bob Ehrlich, Mark Warner, and Anthony A. Williams respectively.)

Since 2012, the Institute for Education has shown a greater focus on technology and innovation, praising collaboration between the federal government and private sector, as seen by the Presidential Innovation Fellow (PIF) program. Two of the four founders of the PIF program are members of IFE Leadership, former U.S. Chief Technology Officer Todd Park and former White House Office of Science and Technology Policy Senior Advisor for Innovation John Paul Farmer.

In 2015, IFE partnered with the Viterbi School of Engineering at the University of Southern California to offer a free coding summer camp for underrepresented populations from grades K-12 around the Los Angeles area.

In 2016, the Institute for Education celebrated its 25th season anniversary.

Notable people
Kathy Kemper: Founder and CEO 
H.E. Jean-Arthur Regibeau, Ambassador of the Kingdom of Belgium and IFE Diplomatic Steward
H.E. Stavros Lambrinidis, Ambassador of the European Union and IFE Diplomatic Steward of AI
Devika Anand Patil, IFE Digital Ambassador, IFE Board of Stewards
Matt Cutts, IFE Board of Stewards
Dr. R. David Edelman, IFE Board of Stewards
John Paul Farmer, IFE Board of Stewards
Tom Friedman, IFE Board of Stewards
Amy Geng, MD, IFE Innovation Steward, IFE Board of Stewards
Kristen Honey, PhD, IFE Director of Innovation, IFE Board of Stewards
Andrea MItchell, IFE Board of Stewards
Todd Park, IFE Board of Stewards
Megan Smith, IFE Board of Stewards
Judge William Webster, IFE Board of Stewards

References

External links
Speakers list

Non-profit organizations based in Washington, D.C.
Organizations established in 1991